The 2017–18 Biathlon World Cup – Stage 7 was the 7th event of the season and was held in Kontiolahti, Finland, from 8 March until 11 March 2018.

Schedule of events

Medal winners

Men

Women

Mixed

Achievements
 Best performance for all time

 , 1st place in Mass Start

References 

Biathlon World Cup - Stage 7, 2017-18
2017–18 Biathlon World Cup
Biathlon World Cup
Biathlon competitions in Finland
Kontiolahti